Ella Bella Bingo is a pre-school animated TV series, co-produced by Singapore-based August Media Holdings and Norway's Kool Produktion AS. The show revolves around the adventures of a 5-year-old girl named Ella, who lives in Sunshine Gardens, along with her family and friends.

The first 27 episodes of Ella Bella Bingo (previously known as Sunshine Kathy) were screened on NRK from 2010 until 2011.

The character was originally created in 2009 by illustrator Tom Petter Hansen, and the series was developed the same year by Hansen, scriptwriter Trond Morten K. Venaasen and producer Frank Mosvold.  In 2011, the show was then redeveloped and re-designed by Jyotirmoy Saha of August Media Holdings.

As of April 2015, 105 episodes of Ella Bella Bingo have been produced, The series has been sold in more than 20 countries, including Sweden, Denmark, Finland, Ireland, Singapore, Indonesia, Israel, Taiwan, Turkey, Bangladesh, and all the Middle Eastern and North African countries.

Background
Ella Bella Bingo is targeted at pre-school children. It follows the adventures of happy-go-lucky Ella and her friends. The series is a warm humorous mix of fun and laughter. Each 7-minute episode is about how Ella uses her boundless creativity, infectious enthusiasm, and a never-give-up attitude to solve everyday problems in innovative ways.

Ella Bella Bingo is directed by the Emmy-nominated and BAFTA winner Ginger Gibbons and scripted by the acclaimed writer Sam Barlow.

Plot
Energetic and artistic Ella is the heartbeat of our series. Ella is a regular 5-year-old girl who lives with her dad, friends, and neighbours in an apartment block called Sunshine Gardens. What makes Ella special is that she is upbeat and fun-loving, always fizzing with enthusiasm and ideas. Ella and her friends often find themselves in sticky situations (or as Ella puts it, "Uh-oh, what a pickle!" moments). Luckily Ella has the remarkable ability to solve these problems in spectacular and surprisingly creative ways. Ella’s "Bingo" moments invariably involve the participation of the entire Sunshine Garden gang. Relationships are central to our show. Ella’s neighbours are her extended family. They all look out for one another, providing adventure and encouragement, making Sunshine Gardens a safe and interesting place to live.

Characters
 Henry: Henry is Ella’s best friend. Henry and Ella are like yin and yang – they complement each other, yet are very different in their outlooks. A confessed science geek, Henry finds Ella’s company exhilarating
 Ella’s dad: Ella’s dad is an illustrator and like many single parents, he’s busy doing a lot of things, but he always makes sure that he has time from Ella.
 Lisa and Lottie: Lisa and Lottie are a little older than Ella, and they live on the floor above Henry. Lisa and Lottie are identical twins and yet are very different from one another. Lottie’s passion is singing, while Lisa is a gymnast.
 Mrs. Berg: Mrs. Berg is Ella’s elderly neighbour. On the surface, Mrs. Berg seems like the classic granny, but don’t be fooled. In her younger days, Mrs. Berg led a life that few others have. Wait till you hear all the untold stories about her exploits in some of the most exotic parts of the world.
 Mr. Jackson: Mr. Jackson is the caretaker of Sunshine Gardens. If Mrs. Berg is the surrogate grandmother, then Mr. Jackson is the grandfatherly equivalent. A good-natured helper to others, his job is to keep the building running, which he does, despite his forgetful nature, and the bemusement of the other adults.

Episodes

Season 1 (2011)
Original air date : 1 December 2011 (NRK Super)

Season 2 (2013)
Original air date : 21 December 2013 (NRK Super)

Season 3 (2014)
Original air date : 4 December 2014 (NRK Super)

Broadcast 
Ella Bella Bingo is broadcast on Scandinavian channels such as NRK, DR and SVT, on Okto channel in Singapore, TG4 in Ireland, Kidu.Co in Turkey, DaaiTV in Indonesia, Good TV in Taiwan, Hop TV in Israel, Duronto TV in Bangladesh, and on the Al Jazeera network across the MENA countries.

Film

Ella Bella Bingo was adapted into a 75-minute eponymous feature film which was released on 24 January 2020. In the film, Ella Bella and Henry are best friends with a plan of making a circus together, but when cool kid Johnny arrives in Sunshine Gardens he becomes Henry's new best friend, making Ella jealous and jeopardising the circus. It was a commercial success, grossing $981,814 against a budget of NOK 1,350,000 ($164,213), and received mixed to positive reviews from critics.

References

External links

Television series set in the 2010s
Computer-animated television series
NRK original programming
2010 Norwegian television series debuts
Norwegian children's television series
Animated television series about children
Animated preschool education television series
2010s preschool education television series
2010s animated television series
Children's animated television series